INFOPRO Sdn Bhd ('Infopro') is a Malaysian based software house that specialises in core banking that provides front and back end banking software known as eICBA system. The eICBA system consists of core banking system known as ICBA (Integrated Computerised Banking System) and systems for Business Intelligence, ATM, e-Switch, Internet Banking and Telebanking. The core banking system also handles Islamic banking

Infopro won the Ministry of International Trade and Industry (MITI)'s Export Excellence Award (Services) in 2010. Inntron, an information technology consultancy in the Banking and Finance sector globally ranked Infopro to be top 2 vendors in Malaysia and within the top 40 of core banking vendors in world

Overseas office profile

Infopro is based in Malaysia and has regional offices in  China, Singapore, and the United Arab Emirates.

Infopro Organisation Structure

Infopro employs a staff of more than 250, with 70% technical staff, 20% support staff, and 10% business team.

ICBA system 

The ICBA version 1.0 was formally released in 1990 and the latest ICBA version is 10.0 -

ICBA product features

ICBA system is a core banking system that integrates both front end banking such as teller functions and back end banking such as back office function, administration, customer information, accounting and data centre functions. The modules are packaged under ICBA system includes the following modules: - 
 Customer Information Module
 Deposit Modules (such as Saving, Current, Fixed Deposit)
 Loan Modules (such as Term Loan, Hire Purchase, Leasing)
 Trade Finance Module
 Treasury Module
 Remittance Module
 Swift Modules
 Nostro Reconciliation Module
 Fixed Asset Module
 eBanking Modules
 General Ledger Module
 Anti Money Laundering Module
 Central Bank Reporting Module

The Customer Information Module is the central module for the ICBA system.

Current eICBA deployments

ICBA system has been installed in more than 82 financial institutions worldwide and has international presence in more than 27 countries including Afghanistan

ICBA Islamic Certification

ICBA Islamic modules have been certified by a Syariah expert, Dr Mohd Daud Bakar who is an associate professor at the Department of Islamic and Family Law and also the dean of the Centre for Postgraduate Studies at the International Islamic University Malaysia.

Infopro Online Support

Support for eICBA is done via web based support homepage known as CSSi (Customer Support System – internet).

Sources 
 http://solutions.oracle.com/partners/infopro
 http://www.accessmylibrary.com/coms2/summary_0286-20737183_ITM
 http://web10.bernama.com/kpdnhep/news.php?id=236180
 http://www.inntron.com/banksys/infopro.htm
 http://www.cpilive.net/v3/inside.aspx?scr=n&NID=1252&cat=CASE%20STUDY&pub=COMPUTER%20NEWS%20MIDDLE%20EAST&k=transformation,%20banking
 http://www.accessmylibrary.com/coms2/summary_0286-20737183_ITM
 http://www.ibsintelligence.com/index.php?option=com_content&view=article&id=10053:afghan%20bank%20signs%20for%20icba&catid=175:2007&Itemid=32
 https://web.archive.org/web/20100607030527/http://www.dinarstandard.com/finance/IF_Tech100509.html
 https://web.archive.org/web/20100701171923/http://www.mfqasia.com/clients.asp
 http://www.inntron.com/toprank_malaysia.htm
 http://www.inntron.com/core_banking.html

Notes

Software companies of Malaysia
Banking software companies
Software companies established in 1987
1987 establishments in Malaysia
Malaysian brands
Privately held companies of Malaysia